The Jacksonville mayoral election of 2003 took place on May 13, 2003. The two candidates to advance to the runoff were Republican millionaire John Peyton, and Democratic former Sheriff of Jacksonville Nat Glover. John Peyton won the election.

First-round results

Runoff election

Polling

Results

Notes

References

2003 Florida elections
Government of Jacksonville, Florida
2003 United States mayoral elections
2003